The European Ford Granada is a large executive car manufactured by Ford Europe from 1972 until 1994. 

The first-generation model was produced from 1972 to 1976 at Ford’s German factory in Cologne and at its British factory in Dagenham. In 1976, production switched entirely to Germany. The original version was replaced in 1977 by a second-generation model which was produced until 1985. From 1985 to 1994, the Granada name was used, in the United Kingdom and Ireland only, for a third-generation model which was sold in other European markets as the Ford Scorpio and in North America as the Merkur Scorpio.



Mark I (1972–1977)

Launched in March 1972, the Granada succeeded the British Ford Zephyr, and the German P7-series as Ford's European executive car offering, and completed the integration of Ford's British and German model ranges. 

At first, lower models in the range were called the Ford Consul. This may have been because of a lawsuit by Granada Group, a major British conglomerate of the time; however, their application for an injunction failed at appeal and they could not prevent Ford from registering the name Granada as a trademark thus from 1975 on they were all called Granadas. The car soon became popular for taxi, fleet, and police use. It was also converted into limousine and hearse versions by the British companies Coleman Milne and Woodall Nicholson. Traditional four-door limousines were offered (both long and short versions) alongside an unusual four-door "coupé limousine" (only 12 built), as well as hearses in either two- or four-door configurations.

Mechanically, the British Granada conformed to Ford convention, the initial range using the Ford Essex V4 unit in 2.0 L displacement, and the Essex V6 engine in 2.5 and 3.0 L capacities. German models employed a Ford Taunus V4 engine in 1.7 L displacement, or the 3.0L Essex V6, or, more commonly the Cologne V6 in 2.0, 2.3, or 2.6 L capacities. The V4 engine option was short lived - and was later replaced by the in-line "Pinto" (TL-series) unit in 1974. The car generally followed the mechanical layout of its predecessors Ford Zephyr/Zodiac, using a coil-spring independent rear end, although front MacPherson struts were replaced by double wishbones, introduced 18 months earlier in smaller TC Cortina and Taunus. However, the Granada – like Ford 17M/20M/26M – featured drum brakes at rear, as opposed to the Zephyr/Zodiac rear disc brakes.

The car was available as a four-door saloon, a five-door estate (Turnier), and a two-door fastback coupé. The early (1972–73) coupé had slightly different sheet metal - a more pronounced coke bottle styling. In 1974, the coupé was revised, with  straighter lines. A two-door saloon joined the range in May 1973, reducing the entry-level advertised German price of the car by 415 Marks, but the two-door saloon version was never produced nor officially sold in the UK. The revised “straight line rear wing” coupé was sold only in 3.0 Ghia trim in the UK, but elsewhere in Europe it was sold with other trims and all engines were available. This was the reverse of the situation with the TC Cortina and Taunus, where the British model had the "coke-bottle" styling. In continental Europe, the 1976-1977 Granadas were also available with the fuel-injected Cologne V6, producing .

South Africa
Most Granadas in South Africa, however, were fitted with the 3.0 L six. The 2.5 L V6 was also offered, although this model was discontinued in 1975 as the six-cylinder Cortina increased in sales. The Granada was introduced to South Africa in late 1972 in 3000 GXL automatic trim, with other models (3000 XL, Coupé, 2500 L) to follow. The coupé was the last model planned, with a scheduled introduction for May 1973. The Granada replaced both the Australian-made Falcon (sold as a "Fairmont" locally) and the 20M of German origins.

Mark II (1977–1985)

The square and straight-lined Granada Mark II - known internally within Ford as "Granada 78" - was released in August 1977 (for the 1978 model year) and was produced until April 1985 following a mild facelift and attention to drivetrain noise, vibration, and harshness in 1981. The Mark II was essentially a reskin of the 1972 car, with new external panelwork that brought the Granada into line with Ford's new design language initiated by stylist Uwe Bahnsen, taking styling cues also used on the recently launched Cortina/Taunus Mk IV and Mk I Fiesta. The rear panelwork of the estate version was virtually unchanged from the Mk I Granada apart from details. The engineering was very similar, the main differences being the "Cologne" V6 engine in 2.0, 2.3, and 2.8 L forms replacing the older "Essex" unit, and the introduction of features such as air conditioning and, for the top-priced 2.8-litre versions, fuel-injection. In mainland Europe, a 1.7 L V4 was originally available. By the time of its introduction, UK Granada production had been quietly abandoned "for some time"; UK market Granada IIs were imported from Germany.  Internally within Ford, the "Cologne" 1.7, 2.0, 2.3, and 2.8 units were the last derivatives of the 'V-Taunus' range of engines.  UK and Irish spec 2.0 Granadas used the 4-cylinder ""Pinto" (or TL-series) engine, as did continental market 1.6 versions - this smaller capacity was deemed too small for the British and Irish markets and was therefore not offered. 

The coupé was discontinued when the new model began production, although there was a two-door saloon version in certain European markets. A relatively low number of vehicles were also produced with an Indenor four-cylinder diesel engine in 1.9-, 2.1- and 2.5-litre capacities. Originally only available as four-door saloons (the later 2.5 also as an estate), most of these went to taxi operators, and few survive. The smallest 1.9 was quite underpowered and was soon replaced by the somewhat more powerful 2.1, which was presented as the "Granada GLD" in March 1979 at Geneva. By 1982, this was replaced by the more capable 2.5. 

Fuel-injected 2.8 models were originally rated at 160bhp and offered with a unique 'S' pack (based on L trim but with updated suspension, TRX wheels and tyres and spotlights) or with normal GL or Ghia trim. In 1979, the “iS” and “iGL” were replaced by the 2.8i GLS. A limited edition “Sapphire” model was also announced with slightly different trim and two tone blue over silver paintwork (strangely, the rocker panels were painted in body colour rather than matt black which made the side profile of the car look deeper and less sleek). Today early injection models are particularly rare. The 2.8i S model was immortalised by the silver vehicle used in the TV series The Sweeney. Changes for 1980 were limited to new colours and new, more comfortable seats.

The Granada was a strong seller in the UK, peaking in 1979 as the seventh best selling car with more than 50,000 sales, and also appearing in the top 10 for sales figures in 1978 and 1982. It remained the best selling car in this sector in Britain throughout its whole production run, despite competition from the likes of the Leyland Princess, Rover SD1 and Vauxhall Carlton.

Due to import restrictions, Ford was only selling the Fiesta in Spain (as it was manufactured there) in the 1970s. In 1979, Ford received authorization to sell the Granada and Taunus as well, but competing manufacturers accused Ford of selling below cost to lower tariffs. Import authorization for the Granada (as well as the Taunus) was briefly suspended but eventually reinstated with the proviso that Ford raise the sales price by fifteen percent.

Ford Australia used the Granada MkII as the template for the 1979-84 Ford Falcon XD/XE-series, using an enlarged version of the Granada's bodyshell, although the two cars share almost no engineering commonality despite looking almost identical to the casual observer.

Facelift
The range had a facelift in September 1981 (often unofficially known as the Mk2b or Mk2 Series 2, and is sometimes referred to as Mk3 outside of the UK as the Scorpio only received the Granada name plate in the UK.) with larger wrap-around bumpers, a three-bar body coloured grille (Or 2 bar with Chrome Border on Ghia & Ghia X), revised dashboard, restyled taillights, and redesigned seats which improved driver and passenger comfort. The two-door saloon was discontinued. There were also a number of detail improvements under the shell; the gearbox, clutch, and brakes were revised, the semi-trailing arm rear suspension geometry was altered, and variable rate rear springs became standard across the range. In Continental Europe the 1.7-liter V4 engine at the bottom of the lineup was replaced by the more modern, but still overworked, 1.6-liter Pinto engine. The British lineup began with the 2-liter four.  The interior remained largely the same, apart from detail changes such as new trim materials and steering wheels - the dashboard layout was altered with the heater controls now oriented vertically next to the instrument cluster to make space for the optional trip computer, and higher models in the range now featured the electronic check-light system first seen on the Escort MkIII housed within an aircraft style overhead console above the rear view mirror.

In most of Europe an even sportier looking Granada was added to the range as the Granada 2.8 Injection which had white metric-sized alloy wheels with Michelin TRX tyres, uprated suspension, Recaro seats, deep front valance and bootlid spoilers, colour coded bumpers, front spotlights and blackened trim. This model used the same 2.8 injected engine, now slightly down rated at 150bhp, usually used in the Ghia models. Towards the end of its production run, the introduction of the 2.0 and 2.3 LX saloon and estate UK marketing packs provided lower cost versions with a slightly higher specification than the "base" L models. GL trim was also offered briefly on vehicles with 2.0 engines and Ghia trim was offered on a diesel engine model with the introduction of the 2.5 D Ghia.

A special Ford of Britain-only marketing pack edition of the Ghia X model was later introduced as the "Ford Granada Ghia X Executive" which standardised luxury appointments such as the high-grade Connolly Leather interior that had previously been an optional fitment. Further refinements such an electric slide and tilt sunroof, electric boot release on saloons, electric seat adjustment, heated seats, a trip computer, and air conditioning set the Granada Ghia X above most other cost-comparable executive cars available in the UK in the early '80s. The special "Taxi" edition was available only in black, which included a foot-operated "panic button" in the driver's footwell which would operate the alarm system. In addition to these two models, the range was complemented by estate models which reflected the same appointment levels as the entire saloon range, including the Ghia X, but not the Ghia X Executive model.

Special models
Ford subcontracted assembly to Hyundai Motor Company in South Korea for sales in that market, where it continued to be sold from October 1978 to 1986 when it gave way to the Hyundai Grandeur instead of smaller European Fords like the Sierra and Escort. Production ended in December 1985, after 4,743 had been built. The car originally received a 2.0-liter V6 engine with a two-barrel Solex carburetor, but after 1980, the more economical 2-litre four-cylinder was also available. The Granada competed with the Saehan Rekord, as well as the Peugeot 604, imported by Kia Motors. , the eldest son of Hyundai's founder Chung Ju-yung, died in a car accident in a Granada.

Additionally, hearses were offered by outside conversion companies, as well as a series of four-door limousines built by Coleman Milne. These included the slightly stretched "Minster" 15 cm, and the 68 cm longer "Dorchester" and better equipped "Grosvenor". As of autumn 1982, the Dorchester was also available in an estate version with elongated rear doors, called the "Windsor".

Mark III (1985–1994)

In April 1985, the third-generation car arrived, which was essentially a rebadged Ford Scorpio, the Granada name being used in both Ireland and the United Kingdom only, with the Scorpio badge (which covered the whole range in Continental Europe) being used instead as a trim designation for the top of the range models. The Mark III Granada was the first European volume production model to have antilock brakes fitted as standard across the range. It was voted European Car of the Year in 1986.

Engine options included the familiar SOHC Pinto engine, in either tax-barrier undercutting 1.8 L form, or a more powerful 2-litre version with fuel injection available. The Cologne V6 engines were carried over from the previous range in short-lived (and not much more powerful than the 2 L Pinto) 2.4 L, and 2.8 L (later 2.9 L) capacities. In 1991, a new range-topping vehicle was introduced, the Scorpio 24-valve.

This version of the Granada continued the "Ford family" styling concept from the previous versions; this time, the car superficially resembled a larger version of the Cortina's successor, the Ford Sierra.  It had followed the precedent set by both the Sierra and the Escort Mk III in changing from the angular saloon styling of their predecessors to an advanced aerodynamic hatchback body style.

The Ford Granada Mk III was the last car to bear the Granada badge in the UK and Ireland, being replaced in 1994 with the pan-European Scorpio. The Scorpio shared its platform doors and roof with the Mk III Granada. The styling of the nose and tail sections were updated to match the ovoid designs being used across the Ford range in the 1990s. On the Scorpio, this resulted in a controversial design. After a 1998 redesign, it was taken out of production the same year with total European sales being 95,587 units.

References

External links

Ford Granada Club Community page for all Ford Granada Owners
The Ford Granada Owners Guild of the U.K
FGCUK Ford Granada Club UK
Ford Granada Mk123 Club
Granada & Scorpio Online

Granada (Europe)
Cars introduced in 1972
1980s cars
1990s cars
Executive cars
Rear-wheel-drive vehicles